Jaakko Forsman (1839, Vähäkyrö — 1899) was a Finnish jurist and politician, as well as a leading activist of the Fennoman movement.

In 1857, he attained his doctorate in law at the University of Helsinki with the first Finnish language dissertation ever submitted to the Faculty of Law there. In 1879, he was appointed professor of law and legal history. He was acting rector of the university from 1896 to 1899.

His contributions to the 1889 Finnish Criminal Code and his lectures in criminal law, which came to be regarded as the code's authentic interpretation, earned him the title of "Father of Finnish Criminal Law". Forsman also wrote a seminal text on Finnish legal history, Suomen lainsäädännön historia (1896), and served in the Diet of Finland from 1882 until his death.

References

Footnotes

1839 births
1899 deaths
People from Vähäkyrö
People from Vaasa Province (Grand Duchy of Finland)
Finnish Party politicians
Members of the Diet of Finland
Finnish jurists
Finnish legal scholars
Academic staff of the University of Helsinki
Rectors of the University of Helsinki